Phikzvirus (synonym: PhiKZ-like viruses, Phikzlikevirus before 2015) is a genus of viruses in the order Caudovirales, in the family Myoviridae. Bacteria serve as natural hosts. There are three species in this genus.

Phages in this genus are considered large or "jumbo" phages. Three phages in this genus (φKZ, φPA3, and 201φ2-1) are known to assemble a "phage nucleus" structure similar in function to the eukaryotic cell nucleus that encloses DNA as well as replication and transcription machinery. These structures are built from a tubulin-like PhuZ protein and a gp105 shell protein. It provides immunity to host defenses like restriction enzymes and CRISPR-Cas systems.

Taxonomy
The following three species are assigned to the genus:
 Pseudomonas virus PA7
 Pseudomonas virus phiKZ
 Pseudomonas virus SL2

Structure

Phikzviruses are nonenveloped, with a head and tail. The head has icosahedral symmetry (T=27), with a relatively large diameter of about 140  nm. The tail is around 160 nm long, 35 nm wide.

Genome
Genomes are circular, around 280kb in length. Two of the three species have been fully sequenced and are available from ICTV. They range between 211k and 280k nucleotides, with 201 to 306 proteins. The complete genomes, along with one other similar but unclassified genome, are available here.

Life cycle
Viral replication is cytoplasmic. The virus attaches to the host cell using its terminal fibers, and ejects the viral DNA into the host cytoplasm via contraction of its tail sheath. DNA-templated transcription is the method of transcription. Once the viral genes have been replicated, the procapsid is assembled and packed. The tail is then assembled and the mature virions are released via lysis. Bacteria serve as the natural host. Transmission routes are passive diffusion.

History
According to the ICTV's 2009 report, the genus PhiKZ-like viruses was first accepted as a new genus, at the same time as all three of its contained species. This proposal is available here. In 2012, the name was changed to Phikzlikevirus. This proposal is available here. The genus was later renamed Phikzvirus.

References

External links
 Viralzone: Phikzlikevirus
 ICTV

Myoviridae
Virus genera